Pedaliodes is a genus of butterflies from the subfamily Satyrinae in the family Nymphalidae found from Mexico to South America. The genus was erected by Arthur Gardiner Butler in 1867.

Species
Listed alphabetically: (There are additional species which have not yet been assigned binomial names.)

References

 Lamas, Gerardo (2004). Atlas of Neotropical Lepidoptera; Checklist: Part 4A; Hesperioidea-Papilionoidea
 Pyrcz, T. W. (2008). "Description of a new pronophiline butterfly from the Venezuelan Cordillera de Mérida previously known as Pedaliodes ferratilis form luteocosta Adams & Bernard with data on its altitudinal distribution (Lepidoptera: Nymphalidae: Satyrinae)". Genus. 19 (1): 125-134.
 Pyrcz, T. W. & Viloria, A. L. (2012). "Revalidation of Pedaliodes lithochalcis Butler & Druce, description of a new species from Peru and Bolivia and a new subspecies of P. napaea Bates from Honduras (Lepidoptera: Nymphalidae: Satyrinae)". Genus. 23 (1): 133-152.
 Pyrcz, T. W.; Viloria, A. L. & Boyer, P. (2008). "Systematics, bionomics and zoogeography of high Andean pedaliodines. Part 5: Revisional notes on Pedaliodes chrysotaenia with the description of a related species (Lepidoptera: Nymphalidae: Satyrinae)". Genus. 19 (3): 377-387.
 Pyrcz, Tomasz W.; Viloria, Angel L.; Boyer, Pierre & Lamas, Gerardo (2008). "Systematics, bionomics and zoogeography of high Andean pedaliodines. Part 6: Pedaliodes demathani Pyrcz- a widely polytypic species from Peru and Bolivia (Lepidoptera: Nymphalidae: Satyrinae)". Genus. 19 (3): 389-407.
 Pyrcz, T. W.; Viloria, A. L. & Lamas, G. (2008). "Systematics, bionomics and zoogeography of high Andean pedaliodines. Part 7: A sister species of Pedaliodes paneis (Hewitson) from Central Peru (Lepidoptera: Nymphalidae: Satyrinae)". Genus. 19 (3): 409-417.
 Pyrcz, T. W.; Viloria, A. L.; Boyer, P. & Lamas, G. (2008). "Systematics, bionomics and zoogeography of high Andean pedaliodines. Part 8: Pedaliodes niveonota Butler and new related species from Central Peru (Lepidoptera: Nymphalidae: Satyrinae)". Genus. 19 (3): 419-431.
 Pyrcz, Tomasz W.; Viloria, Angel L. & Boyer, Pierre (2008). "Systematics, bionomics and zoogeography of high Andean pedaliodines. Part 9: Notes on Pedaliodes pammenes (Hewitson) and related species with the descriptions of nine new taxa (Lepidoptera: Nymphalidae: Satyrinae)". Genus. 19 (3): 433-470.
 Pyrcz, Tomasz W.; Viloria, Angel L.; Boyer, Pierre & Lamas, Gerardo (2008). "Systematics, bionomics and zoogeography of high Andean pedaliodines. Part 10: Revisional notes on Pedaliodes tyro Thieme with the description of new allied taxa from central and southern Peru (Lepidoptera: Nymphalidae: Satyrinae)". Genus. 19 (3): 471-495.
 Pyrcz, Tomasz W. & Viloria, Angel L. (2008). "Systematics, bionomics and zoogeography of high Andean pedaliodines. Part 11: A new subspecies of Pedaliodes ornata Grose-Smith et Kirby in the Venezuelan Cordillera de Mérida (Lepidoptera: Nymphalidae: Satyrinae)". Genus. 20 (1): 13-22.
 Pyrcz, Tomasz W.; Viloria, Angel L. & Lamas, Gerardo M. (2009). "Systematics, bionomics and zoogeography of high Andean pedaliodines. Part 12: A new polytypic species and evaluation of the role of the Ucayali - Madre de Dios water divide as a biogeographic barrier (Lepidoptera: Nymphalidae: Satyrinae)". Genus. 20 (3): 493-505.
 Pyrcz, T.; Viloria, A. L. & Lamas, G. (2010). "Systematics, bionomics and zoogeography of high Andean pedaliodines. Part 13: Description and affinities of a new species from the uppermost forests of the valley of Kosnipata, Cuzco (Lepidoptera: Nymphalidae: Satyrinae)". Genus. 21 (4): 615-623.
 Viloria, A. L. (1998). "A new Pedaliodes Butler, 1867 from the Serrania de Tapirapeco, Venezuela (Lepidoptera: Nymphalidae: Satyrinae: Pronophilini)". SHILAP Revista de Lepidopterología. 26 (101): 13-18.
 Viloria, A. L. & Pyrcz, T. W. (1999). "New pronophiline butterflies from the Venezuelan tepuyes (Nymphalidae: Satyrinae)". Journal of the Lepidopterists' Society. 53 (3): 90-98.
 Viloria, A. L.; Pyrcz, T. W. & Orellana, A. (2010). Preview "A survey of the Neotropical montane butterflies of the subtribe Pronophilina (Lepidoptera, Nymphalidae) in the Venezuelan Cordillera de la Costa". Zootaxa, 2622: 1-41.

Satyrini
Nymphalidae of South America
Butterfly genera
Taxa named by Arthur Gardiner Butler